North Kensington is a census-designated place and an unincorporated area in Montgomery County, Maryland, United States. It had a population of 9,497 in 2020.

Geography
As an unincorporated area, North Kensington's boundaries are not officially defined. North Kensington is, however, recognized by the United States Census Bureau as a census-designated place, and by the United States Geological Survey as a populated place located at  (39.040709, −77.071296).

This residential community is on the East and West sides of Connecticut Avenue, Southeast of Veirs Mill Road, and primarily North of University Blvd.  The Montgomery County public schools serving this area are Newport Mill Middle School, Albert Einstein High School and Rockview Elementary School.

Demographics

At the 2000 census there were 8,940 people, 3,527 households, and 2,197 families living in the area. The racial makeup of the area was 67.00% White, 13.31% African American, 0.39% Native American, 8.66% Asian, 0.07% Pacific Islander, 6.33% from other races, and 4.24% from two or more races. Hispanic or Latino of any race were 15.08%.

Of the 3,527 households 25.8% had children under the age of 18 living with them, 47.8% were married couples living together, 11.0% had a female householder with no husband present, and 37.7% were non-families. 29.8% of households were one person and 10.9% were one person aged 65 or older. The average household size was 2.47 and the average family size was 3.07.

The age distribution was 21.0% under the age of 18, 6.3% from 18 to 24, 32.5% from 25 to 44, 23.7% from 45 to 64, and 16.6% 65 or older. The median age was 39 years. For every 100 females, there were 90.5 males. For every 100 females age 18 and over, there were 85.4 males.

The median household income was $65,144 and the median family income  was $75,554. Males had a median income of $46,631 versus $40,609 for females. The per capita income for the area was $28,816. About 3.7% of families and 6.3% of the population were below the poverty line, including 8.4% of those under age 18 and 8.1% of those age 65 or over.

References

Census-designated places in Maryland
Census-designated places in Montgomery County, Maryland